Lambrakis is a Greek surname. It is the surname of:

 Andreas Lambrakis, Greek professional wrestler.
 Christos Lambrakis (1934–2009), Greek journalist and publisher.
 Dimitrios Lambrakis (1886–1957), Greek journalist and publisher.
 Grigoris Lambrakis (1912–1963), Greek athlete, peace activist and politician.

See also
 Grigoris Lambrakis Stadium, association football stadium in Kallithea, Greece.
 Lambrakis Democratic Youth, Greek leftist youth organization named after Grigoris Lambrakis.
 Lambrakis Press Group, Greek media company founded by Christos Lambrakis.
 Stade Georges Lambrakis, association football stadium in Le Port, Réunion.

Greek-language surnames
Surnames